K. nepalensis may refer to:

 Kar nepalensis, a ground beetle
 Kerria nepalensis, a scale insect
 Kobresia nepalensis, a bog sedge
 Krananda nepalensis, a geometer moth